Raymond E. Curtis Field is a baseball park located in Weatherford, TX. It is the home of the Weatherford High School Kangaroos baseball team.

References

External links
 Weatherford ISD

Baseball venues in Texas